Antoñita Colomé (February 18, 1912 – August 28, 2005) was a Spanish film actress. She was a popular star during the Spanish Republic, appearing in films such as World Crisis (1934).

Selected filmography
 The Pure Truth (1931)
 A Gentleman in Tails (1931)
 Mercedes (1933)
 The Man Who Laughed at Love (1933)
 World Crisis (1934)
 The Wicked Carabel (1935)
 The Dancer and the Worker (1936)
 The Lady from Trévelez (1936)
 A Woman in Danger (1936)
 The Reluctant Hero (1941)
 The Wheel of Life (1942)
 Idyll in Mallorca (1943)
 The Gypsy and the King (1946)

References

Bibliography 
 Bentley, Bernard. A Companion to Spanish Cinema. Boydell & Brewer 2008.

External links 
 

1912 births
2005 deaths
Spanish film actresses
People from Seville